The Global Change Master Directory holds more than 28,000 data set descriptions, known as DIFs (Directory Interchange Format).  This format is compatible with the Federal Geographic Data Committee's (FGDC) standard and the international ISO 19115 standard. The purpose of the directory is to provide users with information on the availability of data and services that will meet their needs, along with efficient access to those data and services.  Links are provided, when available, to connect directly to the data or services of interest.

The directory is part of NASA's Earth Observing System Data and Information System (EOSDIS) and also serves as NASA's contribution to the Committee on Earth Observation Satellites (CEOS), through which it is also known as the International Directory Network  (IDN). The international participants contribute descriptions of data and services that are held around the world and have provided valuable guidance in the development and direction of the project over the years.

The directory also offers an online metadata authoring tools for those wishing to share knowledge of available data. One of the cornerstones to effective searches within the directory is twelve sets of controlled keywords that assist in normalizing the search. The development of these keywords was initiated over a decade ago.  Currently, over 7,000 keywords are controlled, with new sets created for better search refinements, as time permits. The keyword sets are widely used throughout the world and are being translated into many languages.  Within the Global Change Master Directory and the IDN, these controlled keywords can be used in combination with a full-text search engine and also for search refinements.

See also
 Earth Observing System Data and Information System (EOSDIS)
 Climate change
 OPeNDAP 
 Ozone
 Sunspot
 Geospatial metadata 
 Solar variation
 IDN

External links
 GCMD Keywords
 International Directory Network
 Earth Science Data and Information System (ESDIS) of NASA

Earth observation projects
American environmental websites
Metadata
NASA programs